Hans-Jürgen Berger (born 21 September 1951 in Remscheid) is a German former long jumper who competed in the 1976 Summer Olympics.

References

1951 births
Living people
German male long jumpers
Olympic athletes of West Germany
Athletes (track and field) at the 1976 Summer Olympics
People from Remscheid
Sportspeople from Düsseldorf (region)